Ninh Bình Stadium is a multi-use stadium in Ninh Bình, Vietnam.  It is currently used mostly for football matches, on club level by XM The Vissai Ninh Bình of the V-League. The stadium has a capacity of 22,000 spectators.

References

Football venues in Vietnam
Buildings and structures in Ninh Bình province
Vissai Ninh Bình FC